Bandera Roja or Red Flag may refer to:

Bandera Roja (Tupiza), a defunct Bolivian newspaper founded in 1947
Peruvian Communist Party - Red Flag (Bandera Roja), a political group in Peru
Red Flag Party (Bandera Roja), a political group in Venezuela
Bandera Roja (Spain), a political group in Spain
Bandera Roja (periodical), a political activism periodical in Puerto Rico